Sarah Blake is an American writer based in Washington D.C. Her debut novel Grange House, set in Victorian era Maine, was published in 2001. Her second, The Postmistress, a story set in Second World War Massachusetts and London, was published in 2010, and a third, The Guest Book, the story of two intertwined families in twentieth-century Germany and the U.S., appeared in 2019.

Life 
Blake taught school and college-level English in Colorado and New York for several years and has taught fiction workshops at institutions including the University of Maryland and George Washington University. The Postmistress received a favourable review from The New York Times, which compared it to Kathryn Stockett's The Help.

Family 
She is married to poet Joshua Weiner.

Bibliography
Grange House (2001) Picador 
The Postmistress (2010) Amy Einhorn Books/Putnam 
The Guest Book (2019) Flatiron Books

References

External links
Official Website
Sarah Blake at Bookbrowse.com

Living people
Novelists from Washington, D.C.
American women novelists
21st-century American novelists
21st-century American women writers
Year of birth missing (living people)
Miss Porter's School alumni
University System of Maryland faculty
George Washington University faculty